Whitworth Hall which stands in Whitworth Hall Country Park, near Spennymoor, County Durham England, is a country house, formerly the home of the Shafto family and now a hotel. It is a listed building.

Descendants of the Shafto family of Shafto Crag, Northumberland, served as Aldermen, Mayors and Sheriffs of Newcastle upon Tyne in the 16th and 17th centuries. In 1652 Mark Shafto, Recorder of Newcastle, purchased the manor of Whitworth. His son Robert, knighted in 1670 was Recorder from 1660 and his grandson was High Sheriff of Durham in 1709.

Two sons of Mark Shafto junior represented Durham City in Parliament: Robert Shafto 1712/3 and 1727/30 and John Shafto 1729-42. John was the father of Robert Shafto, better known as Bobby Shaftoe, who vastly increased the family fortune by his marriage in 1774 to Anne Duncombe of Duncombe Park. Their son Robert Eden Duncombe Shafto, (also Member of Parliament for Durham City and later High Sheriff in 1842), who married Catherine Eden, daughter of Sir John Eden Bt of Windlestone Hall, replaced the old manor house with a new mansion in 1845. The house was substantially destroyed by fire and all that now remains of the 1845 rebuild is the detached library wing. The present two-storey seven-bayed house dates from the rebuild of about 1900.

Branches of the Shafto family had seats at Bavington Hall, Beamish Hall and  Windlestone Hall.

Whitworth Hall Hotel & Deer Park is now privately owned and operated as a hotel and wedding venue.

References
 
 A Genealogical and Heraldic Dictionary of the Commoners of Great Britain and Ireland Burke and Burke Vol 1 1835 p47. Google Books. Shafto of Whitworth.

Grade II listed buildings in County Durham
Country houses in County Durham
History of County Durham
Spennymoor